Leonardo de Lozanne is a Mexican model, fashion designer and singer-songwriter. He is the lead vocalist and frontman of the Mexican rock band Fobia. He was born in Mexico City on 19 December 1970. In 2014 he married actress Sandra Echeverria, with but they separated in 2022 whom he has a son.

Albums 
 Turistas (2002)
 Series de Ficción (1999).

References

External links 
 Interview with Leonardo de Lozanne (in Spanish).
 Official page of Fobia (in Spanish).

Mexican songwriters
Male songwriters
1970 births
Living people
Place of birth missing (living people)
21st-century Mexican singers
21st-century Mexican male singers